The Biggera Creek Dam, or formally the Biggera Creek Flood Mitigation Dam, is a dam established for flood mitigation purposes over the Biggera Creek, located in the South East region of Queensland, Australia. It is operated by the Gold Coast City Council.

Because its sole purpose is flood mitigation, the retention basin behind the dam is almost always empty of water.

See also

List of dams and reservoirs in Australia

References

External links

Buildings and structures on the Gold Coast, Queensland
Dams in Queensland